Live at Ludlow Garage: 1970 is an album by the Allman Brothers Band. It was recorded live at Ludlow Garage in Cincinnati on April 11, 1970. It was released by Polydor Records on April 20, 1990.

The entire recording, including an unreleased rendition of "In Memory of Elizabeth Reed", was remastered and released on a 2015 reissue of Idlewild South.

Track listing

Disc One 
"Dreams" (Gregg Allman) - 10:15
"Statesboro Blues" (Blind Willie McTell) - 8:09
"Trouble No More" (McKinley Morganfield aka Muddy Waters) - 4:13
"Dimples" (James Bracken, John Lee Hooker) - 5:00
"Every Hungry Woman" (Gregg Allman) - 4:28
"I'm Gonna Move to the Outskirts of Town" (William Weldon) - 9:22
"Hoochie Coochie Man" (Willie Dixon) - 5:23

Disc Two 
"Mountain Jam" (Donovan Leitch, Duane Allman, Gregg Allman, Dickey Betts, Berry Oakley, Butch Trucks, Jai Johnny Johanson) - 44:00

Personnel 
Gregg Allman - vocals, organ
Duane Allman - guitar, slide guitar, vocals on "Dimples"
Dickey Betts - guitar
Berry Oakley - bass, vocals on "Hoochie Coochie Man"
Butch Trucks - drums, percussion
Jai Johanny Johanson - drums, percussion

Original Concert Set List 
"Dreams"
"Statesboro Blues"
"Trouble No More"
"Dimples"
"Every Hungry Woman"
"I'm Gonna Move to the Outskirts of Town"
"Hoochie Coochie Man"
"In Memory of Elizabeth Reed"
"Mountain Jam"

References

1990 live albums
The Allman Brothers Band live albums